Ronald Zoodsma (born 5 September 1966 in Sneek, Friesland) is a retired volleyball player from the Netherlands, who represented his native country at two consecutive Summer Olympics, starting in 1988. Under the guidance of head coach Arie Selinger he ended up in fifth place in Seoul, South Korea, followed by the silver medal four years later in Barcelona, Spain.

References
  Dutch Olympic Committee

1966 births
Living people
Dutch men's volleyball players
Volleyball players at the 1988 Summer Olympics
PAOK V.C. players
Volleyball players at the 1992 Summer Olympics
Olympic silver medalists for the Netherlands
Olympic volleyball players of the Netherlands
Sportspeople from Friesland
People from Sneek
Olympic medalists in volleyball
Medalists at the 1992 Summer Olympics
21st-century Dutch people
20th-century Dutch people